Romescamps is a commune in the Oise department in northern France.

See also
 Communes of the Oise department

References

Communes of Oise